John H. Harris may refer to:

 John Hyde Harris (1826–1886), supervisor of Otago Province and Mayor of Dunedin, New Zealand
 John Howard Harris (1847–1925), president of Bucknell University 1889–1919
 John Hobbis Harris (1874–1940), English missionary and Liberal Party politician
 John H. Harris (entertainment) (1898–1969), husband of figure skater Donna Atwood and first owner of the Ice Capades
 John H. Harris, Treasurer of Maryland from 1841 to 1842
 John Henry Harris, Baron Harris of Greenwich

See also
John Harris (disambiguation)